Kamal ud-Din (reigned 1480 – 1505) was the second Hashemite Sultan of Sulu.

The eldest son of his predecessor, Sharif ul-Hāshim, Kamal ud-Din became Sultan on the death of his father in 1480. During his reign, he appointed qadi to administer justice and oversaw the conversion of people in Luzon and the Visayas. He died in 1505 and is buried in a grave, marked by a stone slab, near to Buasa. He was succeeded by his son, Amir ul-Umara.

See also
 Sultans of Sulu

References

Filipino datus, rajas and sultans
1505 deaths
15th-century monarchs in Asia
Sultans of Sulu
Year of birth unknown